Elm Tree Farm is a west Stockton area in the borough of Stockton-on-Tees, County Durham, northern England. Whitehouse Primary School is in the area. It is in the same ward as Bishopsgarth and is near Hardwick.

References

Areas of Stockton-on-Tees